The 1933–34 season was the 28th year of football played by Dundee United, and covers the period from 1 July 1933 to 30 June 1934.

Match results
Dundee United played a total of 35 matches during the 1933–34 season.

Legend

All results are written with Dundee United's score first.
Own goals in italics

Second Division

Scottish Cup

References

Dundee United F.C. seasons
Dundee United